Raymah is a village in western central Yemen. It is located in the Sanaa Governorate.

Villages_in_Yemen